Svojkovice may refer to places in the Czech Republic:

Svojkovice (Jihlava District), a municipality and village
Svojkovice (Rokycany District), a municipality and village